Karl Christian Johann Holsten (March 31, 1825 – January 26, 1897) was a German Protestant theologian.

Holsten was born in Güstrow, Mecklenburg. He was educated at Leipzig, Berlin, and Rostock, where in 1852 he became a teacher of religion at the Gymnasium. In 1870 he went to Bern as professor of New Testament studies, moving from there in 1876 to Heidelberg, where he remained until his death.

Holsten was an adherent of the Tübingen school, and held to Baur's views on the alleged antagonism between Petrinism and Paulinism. Among his writings are:

Zum Evangelium d. Paulus und d. Petrus (1867)
Das Evangelium des Paulus dargestelit (1880)
Die synoptischen Evangelien nach der Form ihres Inhalts (1886)

References

External links
 

1825 births
1897 deaths
19th-century German Protestant theologians
19th-century German male writers
German male non-fiction writers